Badhti Ka Naam Dadhi is a 1974 Bollywood comedy film directed by Kishore Kumar. The name is similar to a previous Kishore Kumar film Chalti Ka Naam Gaadi.

Plot
The premise of the film is that a multimillionaire, who has no heir, decides to leave his wealth to the person who has the longest beard. What follows is complete mayhem as Kishore Kumar and K. N. Singh plot to outwit one another.

Cast
 I. S. Johar as Seth Sohrabji Bandookwala
 Bhagwan Dada as Dr. Ghoosawala
 Sunder as Dr. Dandawala
 Marutirao Parab as Dr.Thappadwala
 Amit Kumar as Fakkad / Jhango
 Ashok Kumar as Gulfam
 Kishore Kumar as Mr.Gypsy/Police Commissioner/Director/Young Constable/Old Constable/Inspector
 Bappi Lahiri as Bhopu
 Sheetal as Julie
 K.N. Singh as Khadak Singh
 Rajesh Khanna as guest appearance
 Asrani as guest appearance
 Bindu as guest appearance
 Anwar Hussain as Rosario
 Hercules as Hercu
 Master Chintu as Munni

Soundtrack

References

External links
 

1974 films
1970s Hindi-language films
1974 comedy films
Films directed by Kishore Kumar
Indian parody films
Cultural depictions of Rajesh Khanna
1974 drama films
Films scored by Bappi Lahiri